Eugrapta angulata is a moth of the family Noctuidae. It is found in New Guinea.

References

Moths described in 1900
Calpinae